Acidovorax temperans is a Gram-negative  bacterium.

References

External links
Type strain of Acidovorax temperans at BacDive -  the Bacterial Diversity Metadatabase

Comamonadaceae
Bacteria described in 1990